Behind Enemy Lines is a 1986 American action film directed by Gideon Amir and starring David Carradine. It is set in the context of the Vietnam War POW/MIA issue where Colonel Cooper, an Airborne commando, is sent to Vietnam to free American soldiers caught in a Vietnamese prisoner of war camp.

The film is also known as Attack Force 'Nam (American DVD title), P.O.W. the Escape (American reissue title).

Plot
Colonel Cooper (David Carradine) is a U.S. Airborne commando who comes to Vietnam with a special mission to liberate imprisoned American soldiers. He gets caught in a North Vietnamese POW camp where there are other Paratroopers and Soldiers. Action is set at the end of the war and he, as the highest-ranking officer in the POW camp, is to be sent to Hanoi and prosecuted by the North Vietnamese. Camp commander Vinh (Mako Iwamatsu) gets an order to send him to court but instead of obeying it, he offers Cooper a deal - he will help him get to the American sector and then Cooper, in return, would help him immigrate to the United States, where Vinh has family.

Cooper promptly disregards his proposition, as he is a tough soldier who would rather sacrifice his own life than help the enemy. However Vinh is persistent persuading him, threatening that if he will not accept his deal, then all of the fellow prisoners from his camp will die. Given that threat Cooper reconsiders Vinh's offer, and accepts the deal, but under one condition - all of the camp prisoners must go with them. Vinh, being short of time (as Hanoi set deadline for sending Cooper to court) OK's the plan and so they leave camp in column of two jeeps and a truck (prisoners are hidden in a tank truck while Cooper goes with Vinh in a jeep). Their journey won't be without obstacles as they need to go through zones controlled by The North Vietnamese, and through the jungle wilderness.

Cast
 David Carradine as Col. James Cooper
 Charles R. Floyd as Sparks
 Mako Iwamatsu as Capt. Vinh
 Steve James as Johnston
 Phil Brock as Adams
 Daniel Demorest as Thomas
 Tony Pierce as Waite
 Steve Freedman as Scott
 James Acheson as McCoy
 Rudy Daniels as Gen. Morgan
 Ken Metcalfe as Gen. Weaver
 Kenneth Glover as Teague
 Irma Alegre as Bargirl
 Spanky Manikan as NVA officer
 Estrella Antonio as Vietnamese mother
 Tony Beso Jr. as Young boy in Se village
 John Falch as GI with Thomas
 Pen Medina as NVA #1 in empty camp
 Chris Gould as POW #1
 Brian Robillard as POW #2
 Leif Erlandson as POW #3
 Brian Tasker as POW #4
 Jim Gaines as POW #5
 Eric Hahn as GI #1
 Mansour Khalili as GI #2
 Tony Realle as GI #3
 Willie Williams as GI #4
 Avraham Karpick as Murphy
 Bill Kipp as Soldier at fuel depot
 Andrew Sommer as Soldier at fuel depot
 Victor Barjo as Soldier at fuel depot
 John Barrett as Soldier at fuel depot
 Henry Strzalkowski as Soldier at fuel depot
 Steven L. Long soldier in helicopter (opening credits)
 Donnald P. Sibble as door-gunner

Soundtrack
Cannon re-used some of the musical scores from 'The Delta Force" (1986)

References

External links
 
 
 
 
 

1986 films
1986 action films
1980s action war films
American action war films
Golan-Globus films
Vietnam War prisoner of war films
Films produced by Menahem Golan
1980s English-language films
1980s American films